Coleophora granulatella is a moth of the family Coleophoridae. It is known from most of Europe to China. It was recently reported from North America, with records from Alberta, British Columbia, Yukon, Arizona, Colorado, Michigan, Wyoming and Washington.
 
The wingspan is 11–13 mm.

The larvae feed on Artemisia campestris. They mine the leaves of their host plant.

References

External links
lepiforum.de

granulatella
Moths described in 1849
Moths of Europe
Moths of Asia
Moths of North America